Kevin Spencer may refer to:

Kevin Spencer (TV series), a cartoon television series developed by Greg Lawrence
Kevin Spencer (musician) (born 1978), Canadian singer-songwriter
Kevin Spencer (U.S. musician), American musician and lead singer of the group Dynasty
Kevin Spencer (American football) (born 1953), American football coach for the Arizona Cardinals
Kevin Spencer (cyclist), Australian cyclist